Uare, or Kwale, is a language of Papua New Guinea. Dialects are Garihe (Garia) and Uare proper (Kwale, Kware). It is spoken in Rigo Inland Rural LLG, Central Province, Papua New Guinea.

References

External links 
OLAC resources in and about the Uare language
Paradisec has two collections that include Kwale language materials including Arthur Cappell's (AC1) and Tom Dutton's (TD1).
Rosetta Project: Uare Swadesh List

Languages of Papua New Guinea
Humene–Uare languages